Novyye Maty (Yañı Matı) is a rural locality (a selo) in Staromatinsky Selsoviet, Bakalinsky District, Bashkortostan, Russia. The population was 323 as of 2010. There are 4 streets.

Geography 
Novyye Maty is located 21 km northeast of Bakaly (the district's administrative centre) by road. Mullanurovo is the nearest rural locality.

References 

Rural localities in Bakalinsky District